Purí is an extinct language of eastern Brazil.

In the 2010s, a Puri language revitalization project was launched in the indigenous village of Maraká’nà (Maracanã), Rio de Janeiro State.

Phonology

A hypothetical inventory of Purí, based on phonological data from various scholars, was created by Neto in 2007.

Consonants

Vowels

References

Purian languages
Extinct languages of South America
Languages extinct in the 19th century
Indigenous languages of Eastern Brazil